DXKS (96.9 FM), broadcasting as 96.9 Easy Rock, is a radio station owned and operated by Manila Broadcasting Company. The station's studio and transmitter are located at the 6th floor, TTK Tower Bldg., Don Apolinario Velez St., Cagayan de Oro.

Established on October 15, 1990, the station was formerly known as 96.9 Love Radio. On July 1, 2009, it rebranded as 96.9 Easy Rock and switched to a soft adult contemporary format.

References

Adult contemporary radio stations in the Philippines
Radio stations established in 1990
Radio stations in Cagayan de Oro
Easy Rock Network stations